The Andhra Pradesh Residential Degree College (APRDC) is a college in Vijayapuri South, Nagarjunasagar. It was established by the initiative taken by the then Chief Minister Sri  Bhavanam Venkatarami Reddy, in 1982 by the Govt. of A.P in G.O.Ms.No. 762 Edn., Dept., Dt.21-9-1982 under the Management of A.P Residential Educational Society (Regd.), Hyderabad in fully Residential and Gurukul Pattern with an aim to cater to the needs of rural talented students at undergraduate level.

The main objective of Society to start APR Degree College at Nagarjuna  is to provide quality education suited to the present day educational scenario in a congenial atmosphere and to help and strive for all-round development of the students. It provides free boarding and hostel facility in addition to free education with the aid of Govt. of Andhra Pradesh. This college is affiliated to Acharya Nagarjuna University.

Since its inception, the college has been producing meritorious students who brought laurels to the college. A  number of students were accepted at IITS, NITs, Indian Institute of Science, Central Universities of Hyderabad, Pondichery, Kerala , JNU, BHU, University of Delhi and other institutions across the country.

The college is equipped with Library and Laboratory facilities. A special feature of the college is the loco parent system, in which batches of 20 students are allotted to a lecturer, called loco parent. The loco parent will supervise overall welfare of his ward which includes not only academic but even health, career guidance and counseling with the help of Alumni.

The Alumni is very active and supporting the outgoing students both financially and academically in the form of scholarships, fellowship, academic guidance etc. The college has successfully celebrated the Silver Jubilee function in December, 2007. Since its inception the college has been securing not only 100% results but also getting good number of University Ranks.

References

External links

Universities and colleges in Guntur
Educational institutions established in 1982
1982 establishments in Andhra Pradesh